Quebradilla is a district of the Cartago canton, in the Cartago province of Costa Rica.

History 
Quebradilla was created on 16 March 1983 by Decreto Ejecutivo 14371-G. Segregated from Guadalupe.

Geography 
Quebradilla has an area of  km² and an elevation of  metres.

Demographics 

For the 2011 census, Quebradilla had a population of  inhabitants.

Transportation

Road transportation 
The district is covered by the following road routes:
 National Route 206
 National Route 228
 National Route 407

References 

Districts of Cartago Province
Populated places in Cartago Province